Jemma is a  female given name and variant spelling of Gemma, meaning gem. It may refer to the following people :
 Jemma Dallender, (born 1988) English Film Actress
 Jemma Dolan, member of the Northern Ireland Assembly; 
 Jemma Griffiths (born 1975), birth name of Welsh singer Jem;
 Jemma Lilley (born 1991), English crime fiction writer and murderer
 Jemma McKenzie-Brown (born 1994), an English actress
 Jemma Mitchell (born 1984), British–Australian woman convicted of murder  
 Jemma Redgrave (born 1965), British actress;
 Jemma Rose (born 1992), English footballer;
 Jemma Wellesley, Countess of Mornington (born 1974), British make up artist and model.

Fictional characters
 Jemma Simmons, an Agents of S.H.I.E.L.D. character.

Given names
Feminine given names
English given names
English feminine given names